is the Japanese word for sunflower.

It may refer to:

Companies
Himawari Theatre Group, located in Ebisunishi, Shibuya, Tokyo

People with the given name
, Japanese women's basketball player

Fiction
Himawari Kunogi (九軒ひまわり), a character in the manga and anime xxxHOLiC
Himawari! (ひまわりっ!), an anime title
Himawari (nicknamed Hima), a character in the manga and anime Crayon Shin-chan
Himawari: Kenichi Legend, a Japanese manga series
Himawari, an NHK Asadora from 1996
Himawari Uzumaki (うずまきヒマワリ), a character in the manga and anime series Boruto: Naruto Next Generations
 Himawari Funetani (古谷 向日葵), a character in the manga and anime series YuruYuri

Music

Albums
Himawari (album), a 2000 album by Swayzak

Songs
Himawari (Miho Fukuhara song)
"Himawari" (ひまわり), a 2004 song by Mai Hoshimura
"Himawari" (向日葵), a 2003 song by Ai Otsuka
"Himawari" (ひまわり), a 2005 song by Sugar (group)
"Himawari" (ひまわり), a song by Kiroro
"Himawari" (ヒマワリ), a song by Riyu Kosaka
"Himawari" (ひまわり), a song by Younha
"Himawari" (ひまわり), a song by Hearts Grow
"Himawari" (ひまわり), a song by Kusumi Koharu
"Himawari" (ひまわり), a song by Zigzo
"Himawari" (向日葵), a song by Becky
"Himawari" (ひまわり), a song by Yusuke Kamiji
"Himawari" (向日葵), a song by Mr. Children

Other uses 
 Himawari (satellite), a series of Japanese weather satellites

Japanese feminine given names